"At the Time" is a single by American country music artist Jean Shepard.  Released in February 1974, it was the first single from the album I'll Do Anything It Takes.  The song reached #13 on the Billboard Hot Country Singles chart.

Chart performance

References 

1974 singles
Jean Shepard songs
Song recordings produced by Larry Butler (producer)
1974 songs
United Artists Records singles
Songs written by Bill Anderson (singer)